Sir William Robert Richardson (16 January 1909 – 16 January 1986) was a British newspaper editor.

Born in Newcastle-upon-Tyne, at the age of 14 Richardson began working for the Co-operative News, serving as editor of the paper from 1937 to 1942. In 1936 he became a sub-editor of Reynold's News, becoming editor in 1942 and serving until the paper's closure in 1967. He later served on the Post Office Users National Council, and wrote several books about trade unionism and the co-operative movement.

Books
A Union of Many Trades: A History of USDAW
The CWS in War and Peace
The People's Business: A History Of Brighton Co-operative Society

References

1909 births
1986 deaths
British cooperative organizers
English newspaper editors
English male journalists
Knights Bachelor
Writers from Newcastle upon Tyne